Djaâfra District is a district of Bordj Bou Arréridj Province, Algeria.

Municipalities
The district is further divided into 4 municipalities:
Djaafra
Colla 
El Main
Tafreg

Districts of Bordj Bou Arréridj Province